West Lynn is a village and former civil parish, now in the unparished area of King's Lynn, in the King's Lynn and West Norfolk district, in the county of Norfolk, England. It is west of the River Great Ouse, linked to the main part of King's Lynn by the King's Lynn passenger ferry or by a circuitous 4 km road journey.

West Lynn was originally constituted as a separate civil parish, and in 1894 this became the sole parish in the new King's Lynn Rural District. In 1931 the parish had a population of 931. The parish and district were split on 1 April 1935 with the urban part becoming part of the borough of King's Lynn, and the rest becoming part of the parish of Clenchwarton in Marshland Rural District. Today the name West Lynn usually refers to the former part of the borough of King's Lynn, forming part of the unparished urban area of King's Lynn.  It is in the South and West Lynn Ward of  King's Lynn and West Norfolk Council.

West Lynn has a primary school and a range of basic services.

West Lynn Primary School received a 'good' rating from Ofsted in 2019.

Ferry
The King's Lynn Ferry has linked West Lynn to the main part of King's Lynn since 1285. The ferry is operated by West Lynn Ferry Ltd. and runs Monday to Saturday. It carried 85,000 passengers in 2011. The service is subsidised by West Norfolk Council and was previously subsidised by Norfolk County Council.

Notable people
 Phil Easton, radio broadcaster, born in West Lynn

References

External links

Information from Genuki Norfolk on West Lynn.

Villages in Norfolk
Former civil parishes in Norfolk
King's Lynn